Seal the Deal is the second full-length album by the Chicago based hard rock band The Last Vegas, released on April 10, 2006.

It was the band's second and last release on Get Hip Records before the split from the label. It was also the band's last release with bassist Anthony Rubino.

The album's 7th track, Raw Dog, was featured as a bonus track for the rhythm video game Guitar Hero II.

Track listing

Personnel
Adam Arling - guitar, vocals
Johnny Wator – guitar, vocals
Anthony Rubino – bass
Nate Arling - drums, percussion

References

2006 albums
The Last Vegas albums